YG Plus Inc. (previously Phoenix Holdings Inc.) is a publicly traded media and advertising company acquired by YG Entertainment in November 2014. In 2019, the company entered the music distribution industry and also engages in production, distribution, and licensing of merchandise related to music artists. In January 2021, Hybe Corporation and its technology subsidiary, Weverse Company, acquired 17.89% of the company in a merchandising and distribution deal that would see YG Entertainment's artists join Weverse in return.

History
YG Entertainment acquired Phoenix Holdings, a public relations company from Bongwan Group, in November 2014 and rebranded it as YG Plus. Yang Min-suk, the younger brother of YG Entertainment founder Yang Hyun-suk, was appointed as the company's CEO, with YG Entertainment owning 38.6% of the company's shares. In 2019, the company entered the music distribution industry. On January 27, 2021, it was revealed that Hybe Corporation, and its technology subsidiary, Weverse Company (formerly beNX) invested 70B KRW (~63M USD) in the company, acquiring 17.9% of the company in a merchandising and distribution deal that would see YG Entertainment's artists join Weverse in return. In March 2021, Choi Sung-jun was appointed as the new CEO while Yang Min-suk was appointed as the executive director for the company.

Distributed labels

Present
South Korean (as of 2021)
 YG Entertainment
 The Black Label
 Hybe Corporation
 ADOR
 Big Hit Music
 KOZ Entertainment
 Pledis Entertainment
 Source Music
JTBC (select releases only)
Paktory Company
1dow (1day of the week) Records Label
3YE GLOBAL
82attitude
About Entertainment
Andnew
ARA-LINE Entertainment
Archive Morning
ArtBus Company 
Blu Tongue
BoutiqueKM
Chungchun Music
CRAFT AND JUN
dnss
Dopein
Dynasty Muzik
EMA Recordings
FA presents
GFMA
Home Music
Im Dai
Jule
LLANO
MOAI
NEOKIDZ
Niahn
NU DIMENSION
SALON 01
TNK ENT
Tiramisu Records
Ubuntu Entertainment
Viral Kit
WEEKDAY
WHAP.
Worldstar Entertainment
Your Summer

Former
HYPLE (moved to NHN Bugs)

Subsidiaries

KPLUS

YG KPLUS (or YG K+) is a partnership between YG and Korean model management company K-Plus. The merger was announced on February 18, 2014, by co-CEO Yang Min-suk. As of 2014, K-plus model agency housed over 170 models, including Kang Seung-hyun, Park Hyeong-seop, Lee Sung-kyung, Nam Joo-hyuk, Jang Ki-yong, Sandara Park, and Choi Sora. Since the partnership, K-Plus models have appeared in YG recording artists' music videos, as well as YG-owned brands' advertisement campaigns. YG has also reportedly provided YG K+ models with roles in TV dramas, notably Nam Joo-hyuk in Who Are You: School 2015 and Lee Sung-kyung in It's Okay, That's Love, and have formally transitioned models to their acting division.

Moonshot
Moonshot (stylized in all lowercase) is a cosmetics brand launched by YG on October 2, 2016. Developed with China's Huanya Group and in partnership with the cosmetics manufacturing company COSON, the brand is named after Apollo 11's historical landing on the moon. Its cosmetics are manufactured in South Korea and sold online as well as in-store in Samcheong, where according to Paik Ho-jin, an employee of the brand, Chinese shoppers account for 40-50% of the customers. As part of YG's partnership with French luxury conglomerate LVMH, Moonshot was launched at 11 Sephora stores in Singapore and at 13 Sephora stores in Malaysia on September 24, 2015.

Nona9on
Nona9on is a luxury street-wear brand founded in early 2012 by YG and Samsung’s textile subsidiary company Cheil Industries. It operates through secondary retailers and pop-up stores, such as its first pop-up at Apgujeong’s Galleria Department Store. Following its domestic success, the clothing line also quickly sold out in its first international pop-up stores in 10 Corso Como shops in Milan, as well as other locations in Shanghai and Hong Kong. The brand plans to open a pop-up store at JayCo in Taiwan. It often features Bobby & B.I from iKon and Lisa from Blackpink in their commercials and promotions.

YG Sports
YG Golf Academy was established in March 2015, by acquisition of G-AD Communication, a golf agency that handled notable professional South Korean golfers such as Kim Hyo-joo, with YG Plus' aims to expand into golf businesses. Leading golf coach Han Yeon-hee was recruited as the head instructor of the academy. In January 2017, it was renamed as YG Sports to expand into sports businesses.

YG Studioplex
YG Studioplex (stylized in all caps) is a TV drama production company jointly established by YG and Barami Bunda Inc. in April 2017. The studio will "specialise in the production of Korean Wave contents" and enter the global market. The studio was preceded by YG's attempts to get involved in the content production industry, following in the footsteps of SM Entertainment's SM C&C and CJ E&M (now CJ ENM)'s Studio Dragon. In 2016, YG participated in a joint production with NBCUniversal by investing in SBS's Moon Lovers: Scarlet Heart Ryeo. Since then, YG has also actively recruited program directors (PD) from various terrestrial broadcasters, including Producer Park Hong-kyun, who worked on MBC's Queen Seondeok and The Greatest Love.

Works
 I Picked Up a Celebrity on the Street (oksusu, 2018, co-produced with BaramiBunda inc)
 Love Alert (MBN, 2018, co-produced with Big Ocean E&M and Excel Investment)
 Mr. Queen (tvN, 2020, co-produced with Studio Dragon and Crave Works)
 Joseon Exorcist (SBS, 2021, co-produced with Crave Works and Lotte Cultureworks)
 Dr. Brain (Apple TV+, 2021, co-produced with Kakao Entertainment, Bound Entertainment and Dark Circle Pictures)

Other assets

Seoul Music

SEOUL MUSIC (서울뮤직) is YG Plus' brand for music promotion and distribution, which started in June 2019 after it took over the operation of social media accounts of the now-defunct sister label HIGHGRND.

References

YG Entertainment
Advertising agencies of South Korea
Companies based in Seoul
Business services companies established in 1996
South Korean companies established in 1996
Record labels established in 1996
Record label distributors
South Korean record labels